Oktyabrsky Administrative Okrug is a territorial division of the City of Murmansk in Murmansk Oblast, Russia. Population:

History
It was established for the first time by the Decree of the Presidium of the Supreme Soviet of the Russian SFSR of April 20, 1939 as Mikoyanovsky City District and abolished together with the other two city districts on June 2, 1948. All three city districts, including Mikoyanovsky, were created again on June 23, 1951.

The work settlement of Nagornovsky and its settlement soviet were transferred from Kolsky District to the administrative jurisdiction of Murmansk City Soviet by the Decree of the Presidium of the Supreme Soviet of the Russian SFSR of August 5, 1953.

By the Decision of Murmansk Executive Committee of December 30, 1953, Nagornovsky Settlement Soviet with the administrative center in the work settlement of Nagornovsky, which was previously transferred to jurisdiction of Murmansk from Kolsky District by the Decree of the Presidium of the Supreme Soviet of the Russian SFSR of August 5, 1953, was subordinated to Mikoyanovsky City District.

On October 30, 1957, Mikoyanovsky City District was renamed Oktyabrsky, but on September 30, 1958 all city districts of Murmansk were again abolished. On June 10, 1957, two city districts were created in Murmansk, including a larger Oktyabrsky District. On February 21, 1975, Pervomaysky City District was split from Oktyabrsky City District. When the Charter of the Hero City of Murmansk was adopted on December 17, 1995, all city districts started to be referred to as administrative okrugs.

References

Notes

Sources



Murmansk
States and territories established in 1939
States and territories disestablished in 1948
States and territories established in 1951
States and territories disestablished in 1958
States and territories established in 1967